Violet Makuto (born ) is a Kenyan volleyball player. She has been part of the Kenya women's national volleyball team.

She participated in the 2014 FIVB Volleyball World Grand Prix. On club level she played for Kenya Pipeline Company in 2014.

In 2021 Kenya's team for the postponed 2020 Summer Olympics was announced.

References

External links
 Profile at FIVB.org

1993 births
Living people
Kenyan women's volleyball players
Place of birth missing (living people)
People from Kakamega